UDP-glucuronosyltransferase 1-6 is an enzyme that in humans is encoded by the UGT1A6 gene.

Function 

UDP-glucuronosyltransferase 1-6 is a UDP-glucuronosyltransferase, an enzyme of the glucuronidation pathway that transforms small lipophilic molecules, such as steroids, bilirubin, hormones, and drugs, into water-soluble, excretable metabolites.

This gene is part of a complex locus that encodes several UDP-glucuronosyltransferases. The locus includes thirteen unique alternate first exons followed by four common exons. Four of the alternate first exons are considered pseudogenes. Each of the remaining nine 5' exons may be spliced to the four common exons, resulting in nine proteins with different N-termini and identical C-termini. Each first exon encodes the substrate binding site, and is regulated by its own promoter. The enzyme encoded by this gene is active on phenolic and planar compounds. Alternative splicing in the unique 5' end of this gene results in two transcript variants.

This enzyme is also responsible for the inactivation of popular analgesic drugs, such as aspirin and acetaminophen, by glucuronidation. The loss of a functional UGT1A6 gene in certain hypercarnivores, and particularly cats, renders the animals extremely sensitive to the adverse effects of these analgesics.

References

Further reading